Staryye Kandry (İśke Qandra) is a rural locality (a selo) in Kandrinsky Selsoviet, Tuymazinsky District, Bashkortostan, Russia. The population was 308 as of 2010. There are 5 streets.

Geography 
Staryye Kandry is located 35 km southeast of Tuymazy (the district's administrative centre) by road. Kandry is the nearest rural locality.

References 

Rural localities in Tuymazinsky District